This is a list of people who have served as Custos Rotulorum of Glamorgan.

 William Herbert, 1st Earl of Pembroke 1543–1570
 Henry Herbert, 2nd Earl of Pembroke 1570–1601
 Sir John Herbert 1601–1603
 William Herbert, 3rd Earl of Pembroke 1603–1630
 Philip Herbert, 4th Earl of Pembroke 1630–1645
 Sir John Aubrey, 1st Baronet 1645–1646
 Interregnum
 Philip Herbert, 5th Earl of Pembroke 1660–1669
 William Herbert, 6th Earl of Pembroke 1670–1674
 Philip Herbert, 7th Earl of Pembroke 1674–1683
 Thomas Herbert, 8th Earl of Pembroke 1683–1728
 Charles Paulet, 3rd Duke of Bolton 1728–1754
For later custodes rotulorum, see Lord Lieutenant of Glamorgan.

References
Institute of Historical Research - Custodes Rotulorum 1544-1646
Institute of Historical Research - Custodes Rotulorum 1660-1828

Glamorgan